Homospermidine synthase is an enzyme with systematic name putrescine:putrescine 4-aminobutyltransferase (ammonia-forming). This enzyme catalyses the following chemical reaction

 (1) 2 putrescine  sym-homospermidine + NH3 + H+
 (2) putrescine + spermidine  sym-homospermidine + propane-1,3-diamine

The reaction of this enzyme occurs in three steps.

References

External links 

EC 2.5.1